Slave Trade Act is a stock short title used for legislation in the United Kingdom and the United States that relates to the slave trade.

The "See also" section lists other Slave Acts, laws, and international conventions which developed the concept of slavery, and then the resolution and abolition of slavery, including a timeline of when various nations abolished slavery.

List

United Kingdom
 The Slave Trade Act 1788 (a.k.a. Dolben's Act)
 47 Geo 3 Sess 1 c 36, sometimes called the Slave Trade Act 1807
 51 Geo 3 c. 23 Slave Trade Felony Act 1811
 The Slave Trade Act 1824 
 The Slave Trade Act 1843
 8 & 9 Vict c 122 sometimes called the Aberdeen Act (1845)
 The Slave Trade Act 1873
 The Modern Slavery Act 2015

United States
 The Slave Trade Act of 1794
 The Slave Trade Act of 1800
 Act to prevent the importation of certain persons [slaves] into certain states . . ., 1803
 Act Prohibiting Importation of Slaves, 1807
 The Slave Trade Act of 1818
 1819 U.S. law, amended in 1820, which impacted the slave trade
 Act in Relation to Service
 Act for the relief of Indian Slaves and Prisoners

See also 
 Abolition of slavery timeline
 Abolitionism in the United Kingdom
 Abolitionism in the United States
 Slavery in international law
 Slavery in the British Isles
 Slavery in the United States
 Slavery in the colonial history of the United States
 Lyons–Seward Treaty of 1862
 Brussels Conference Act of 1890
 1921 International Convention for the Suppression of the Traffic in Women and Children (League of Nations)
 1926 Slavery Convention (League of Nations)
 1930 Forced Labour Convention of the International Labour Organization
 1948 Declaration of Human Rights (United Nations)
 1956 Supplementary Convention on the Abolition of Slavery (United Nations)
 List of short titles

United Kingdom
 Slavery at common law
 Barbados Slave Code of 1661
 Amelioration Act 1798
 Slavery Abolition Act 1833
 Article 4 of the European Convention on Human Rights
 Human Rights Act 1998

United States
Partus sequitur ventrem
 Fugitive Slave Clause of the U.S. Constitution
 Three-Fifths Compromise of the U.S. Constitution
 Slave and free states
 Slave codes pertaining to individual states
 Northwest Ordinance of 1787
 Fugitive Slave Act of 1793
 Missouri Compromise (1820)
 Webster–Ashburton Treaty of 1842
 Compromise of 1850
 Fugitive Slave Act of 1850
 Act in Relation to Service (1851)
 Confiscation Act of 1861
 Act Prohibiting the Return of Slaves (1862)
 Emancipation Proclamation (1863)
 Thirteenth Amendment to the United States Constitution
 Freedmen's Bureau bills
 Shipping Commissioners Act of 1872

Other
 1871 Law of Free Birth in Brazil
 1888 Lei Áurea (Golden Law) in Brazil
 1793 Upper Canada Act Against Slavery
 Russian Emancipation reform of 1861

References

Lists of legislation by short title
Slave trade in the United States
United States slavery law
Slave trade legislation
Laws in the United Kingdom
British slave trade
Slavery law